The Holy Family Catholic Church Historic District, in Natchez, Mississippi, is a  historic district that was listed on the U.S. National Register of Historic Places (NRHP) in 1995.

Its most significant building is the Holy Family Church, the first African-American Catholic church in the state, dedicated in 1894 and staffed by the Josephites. It is Natchez's best piece of Gothic Revival architecture. The district as a whole is significant for its architecture and for its African-American historical associations.

The listing included 49 contributing buildings and one other contributing site. It includes Greek Revival, Italianate, and Queen Anne architecture.

The area is a historically black neighborhood. The district is a cluster of buildings near to the Holy Family Catholic Church, which is on St. Catherine St., which was originally the old Natchez Trace.

See also
Natchez On-Top-of-the-Hill Historic District, abutting the Holy Family HD on the west, and south of the Upriver HD
Upriver Residential District, adjacent to the Woodlawn HD, on the west
Woodlawn Historic District, another historically black neighborhood historic district (HD)
Natchez Bluffs and Under-the-Hill Historic District, on river side of On-Top-of-the-Hill HD
Downriver Residential Historic District, further south below the On-Top-of-the-Hill HD
Clifton Heights Historic District, on the river side of the Upriver HD
Cemetery Bluff District

References 

Greek Revival church buildings in Mississippi
Italianate architecture in Mississippi
Queen Anne architecture in Mississippi
Churches completed in 1886
Historic districts in Natchez, Mississippi
Historic districts on the National Register of Historic Places in Mississippi
National Register of Historic Places in Natchez, Mississippi
Churches on the National Register of Historic Places in Mississippi
Churches in Natchez, Mississippi

Josephite churches in the United States